WHIH-LP is a Christian radio station licensed to Whitesboro, New York, broadcasting on 97.3 MHz FM.  The station is owned by Lifepoint Church of the Mohawk Valley.

References

External links
 
 

HIH-LP
HIH-LP
Radio stations established in 2014
2014 establishments in New York (state)